Maxine "Blossom" Miles, born 22 September 1901 as Maxine Forbes-Robertson, was a British aviation engineer, socialite, and businesswoman.  She was born into a well-known family of actors.  She became interested in aviation in the 1920s, and married her flight instructor, Frederick George Miles.  Together they eventually founded Miles Aircraft, where she was a draughtswoman and aircraft designer.

Early life
Maxine Forbes-Robertson was born 22 September 1901 to Johnston Forbes-Robertson and his wife, May Gertrude Dermot better known by her stage name of Gertrude Elliott, both actors. Her father was acclaimed, and his family was at the heart of London society. A privileged but grounded upbringing ensured that "Blossom", as she was known in her family, was able to develop her intellectual, sporting and artistic abilities to the full, despite losing an eye at an early age. She was no stranger to the theatre and appeared on the London stage with members of her family on occasion.

Maxine spent her early years with her sisters Jean, Chloe and Diana at Hartsbourne Manor, the home of her aunt Maxine Elliott, a wing of which was used exclusively by Miles's parents. The house, formerly the family seat of Sir Thomas Thompson is now a private members' golf club. The Forbes-Robertsons' main family home was located at 22 Bedford Square in the heart of London's Bloomsbury district.

Forbes-Robertson was a contemporary of Barbara Cartland, with whom she was presented in 1919 as a debutante. Cartland said of Forbes-Robertson ""I do believe that once you know something nasty you can't erase it. That's why when I had my children ... I wouldn't read any racy novels -- because Blossom Forbes-Robertson, who 'came out' with me in 1919, was born with an empty eye socket after her mother acted the role of a one-eyed woman
during pregnancy. So I just tried to think beautiful thoughts."

As a 'bright young thing' along with Lady Diana Cooper and Elsa Maxwell, Forbes-Robertson organised 'treasure hunt' parties across London.

Marriages
Maxine married Captain Hon Inigo Freeman-Thomas (later 2nd Marquess of Willingdon), son of Freeman Freeman-Thomas, 1st Marquess of Willingdon and Lady Marie Brassey, on 8 October 1924. Her married name became Freeman-Thomas. Maxine Elliott (her Aunt) gave Freeman-Thomas a $500,000 dowry on announcement of her marriage, and the couple lived for a time in Miss Elliot's Regents Park home. Maxine's sister, Diana, was to write that Maxine Elliott had swept Maxine's first marriage out of the hands of her parents.

In February 1931, the couple were having a low-wing monoplane built at Shoreham Airport. They planned to fly to India, where Freeman-Thomas's father had been appointed Viceroy. On 7 December 1931, The New York Times reported that Viscount Ratendone (Inigo Freeman-Thomas) was seeking a divorce from Viscountess Ratendone (Maxine Freeman-Thomas). Freeman-Thomas named Frederick George Miles, flying instructor, as co-defendant with Maxine in an undefended suit and was granted a decree nisi. Maxine and Inigo Freeman-Thomas were divorced in 1932. Both Maxine and Freeman-Thomas had been members of the Southern Aero Club of Shoreham, where Miles was a director and instructor. Miles flew his Simmonds Spartan aircraft to South Africa to escape the situation and consider his position; almost immediately he returned, and he and Maxine were soon married.

Aviation
Maxine gained her aviation certificate (Royal Aero Club certificate 9585) through her membership in the Southern Aero Club. One of the first aircraft she owned was a De Havilland DH.60X Cirrus Moth, registered G-EBZG, in 1928, after it had been damaged on landing at Shoreham, sold to Southern Aircraft Ltd, and rebuilt; it was then named "Jemimah".

Of the aircraft Blossom helped design, the Miles Sparrowhawk, is one of the most notable. F. G. Miles decided to compete in the 1935 King’s Cup Air Race and the job of producing a suitable aircraft fell to Maxine, who had just eight weeks to produce an aeroplane. With neither the time or the facilities to create something from scratch, she took a Miles Hawk, shortened the fuselage, improved the streamlining, reduced the wingspan by 5 ft, reduced the height of the undercarriage, moved the legs outwards and away from the propeller slipstream and, finally, installed extra tanks to enable the 140 hp Gypsy Major engine to complete the 953-mile course with only a single re-fuelling stop.

The Miles Trio (George, Fred and Blossom) designs used extensively by the RAF included the Miles Hawk and Miles Master, both of which were used as training aircraft for Hurricane and Spitfire pilots.

Positions and appointments
Maxine (Blossom) was a director of Phillip and Powis Aircraft Ltd, and later, when that company was purchased by her husband and brother-in-law, a shareholder of Miles Aircraft Ltd. Within the Miles company, Blossom Miles was a draughtswoman as well as looking after the social and welfare issues faced by the rapidly expanding company. In 1943 The Miles Aeronautical Technical School opened under her directorship. She designed the Miles Hawk G-ACIZ aircraft which Gabrielle Patterson, Britain's first woman flying instructor (and later one of the "first eight" women pilots in the Air Transport Auxiliary) flew in the King's Cup air race in 1934.

Blossom served as one of five commissioners of the Civil Air Guard which was established in July 1938 to encourage and subsidise pilot training. Formed around civilian flying clubs, subsidised tuition was offered in exchange for an 'honourable undertaking' that in times of emergency, members would serve in the Royal Air Force Reserve.

In 1942, she was a guest speaker at the Women’s Engineering Society's Annual Dinner, help at the Forum Club, speaking on Women in the Drawing Office, based on her personal experiences working on aircraft engineering and training up other women in the field during World War Two. Seven hundred women applied for the first 16 training places at the Phillip and Powis Aircraft Ltd, offered as part of supporting the war effort. Gertrude Entwistle, President of the Women’s Engineering Society stated that they were "proud to count Mrs Miles a member. She would have felt the society would have failed if Mrs Miles had not been a member".

References

Bibliography
 Brown, Don Lambert. Miles Aircraft Since 1925. London: Putnam & Company Ltd., 1970. .

1901 births
British debutantes
British engineers
English aerospace engineers
Ratendone
Year of death missing
Women's Engineering Society
British women engineers
20th-century women engineers
British aviators